The Star-Crossed Romance of Josephine Cosnowski is an American made-for-television family-comedy film, directed by Fred Barzyk, with a script written by Jean Shepherd. Produced by Olvia Tappan, the film is the fourth installment in the Ralph Parker franchise. Based on Shepherd's book, In God We Trust: All Others Pay Cash and similar to all the other Parker Family movies, the film depicts fictionalized events from his real-life childhood.

Released exclusively as it aired on American Playhouse, season four, episode nine, the film was met with positive critical reception, with praise directed at the script, returning cast, and its Thanksgiving setting.

Synopsis
A middle-aged Ralph Parker introduces the film as the character is going to a movie in theaters directed by a Polish director, which reminds him of a memory from his past. Set during the late-1940s to early-1950s America, high school aged Ralph Parker prepares for Thanksgiving celebrations with his family. His father, Mr. Parker decides that he wants to buy a new family vehicle and starts the processes of purchasing a yellow colored Buick, while his younger brother Randy reluctantly practices for his starring role as a turkey in the school Thanksgiving Day play. As the holiday approaches, a Polish family moves in. With the excitement of new next-door neighbors, Ralph discovers that the daughter is the girl of his dreams. He begins his first serious relationship. The pair soon discover that their courtship may prove more difficult to manage than necessary.

Cast
 Pete Kowanko as Ralph "Ralphie" Parker
 Jean Shepherd as Ralph Parker/the Narrator
 George Coe as Mr. Parker
 Barbara Bolton as Mrs. Parker
 Jay Ine as Randy Parker
 William Lampley as Flick
 Jeff Yonis as Schwartz
 Katherine Kamhi as Josephine "Josie" Cosnowski
 Armen Garo as Stosh "Bubba" Cosnowski
 James T. Lahiff as Alex "Killer" Cosnowski
 William B. Lynch as Mr. Cosnowski
 Joan Tolentino as Mrs. Cosnowski
 Frank Toste C.S.C. as Father Casmir

Release
The Star-Crossed Romance of Josephine Cosnowski was released on February 11, 1985 during an episode of American Playhouse.

Sequels
The movie is a part of a larger franchise of films, an adaptation for stage, and a television broadcast adaptation of that play. The film's direct follow-up, Ollie Hopnoodle's Haven of Bliss was released in 1988.

References

External links
 

1976 films
American comedy films
1980s English-language films
1970s English-language films
Films directed by Fred Barzyk
1970s American films
1980s American films